It's About Time is an American science fantasy comedy TV series that aired on CBS for one season of 26 episodes in 1966–1967. The series was created by Sherwood Schwartz, and used sets, props and incidental music from Schwartz's other television series in production at the time, Gilligan's Island.

Description

Astronauts Mac McKenzie (Frank Aletter) and Hector Canfield (Jack Mullaney) travel faster than the speed of light, resulting in being sent back in time to prehistoric days where they have to adjust to living with a cave-dwelling family led by Shag/Shad (Imogene Coca) and Gronk (Joe E. Ross). Their children were 18 year-old Mlor (Mary Grace) and 14 year-old Breer (Pat Cardi). Tribe chief Boss (Cliff Norton) and his right-hand man Clon (Mike Mazurki) were always suspicious of the astronauts.

Ratings were impressive for the first few weeks on the air, but they soon plunged. Show creator Schwartz concluded that three factors were the cause of the decline in audience interest:

Repetition of the astronauts being in danger from dinosaurs, clubs, spears, volcanoes, and cavemen
An unattractive look to the show (e.g., caves, dirt streets, etc.)
The cave dwellers speaking a primitive form of English that was difficult to listen to

He retooled the series beginning with the January 22, 1967 episode, after 18 episodes set in prehistoric times, essentially reversing the premise which had been shown the first half of the season. The astronauts repair their space capsule and return to 1967, with Shad, Gronk, and their children in tow. Boss and Clon make their final appearances in this episode, which also introduces two new supporting characters who remained with the show: Alan DeWitt as Mr. Tyler, manager of the apartment building where Mac and Hector live, and Frank Wilcox as General Morley, their commanding officer.

The prehistoric family begins adjusting to life in the 1960s, reacting to the unfamiliar surroundings and setting up home in 20th-century Los Angeles. For example, Gronk and Shad had to learn to write their names and sign them for many salesmen who brought "presents" which had to be paid for later. Mac and Hector also had to convince their disbelieving superior that they really did travel in time, and are not playing some sort of elaborate practical joke. Seven episodes were produced with this new premise before the series was cancelled at the end of the season.

According to Pat Cardi who played Greer, CBS considered reversing their cancellation decision after ratings improved during summer reruns, however Imogene Coca and Joe E. Ross had already committed to other projects, officially ending the series.

Episodes

 
 "The Stowaway" was originally scheduled to air January 15, 1967, but was pre-empted by an episode of Lassie after CBS revamped its prime time line up following  the first-ever Super Bowl which aired earlier that evening. This episode was set in prehistoric times, and clearly predates the previous seven episodes. However, it did not air until April 2, 1967. In the show's current syndication reruns on certain networks – such as Antenna TV – this episode airs in its intended order, immediately preceding "20th Century Here We Come...".

Home release
On June 27, 2017, ClassicFlix released The Complete Series on DVD in region 1.

Merchandising

The TV series was adapted into a comic strip by Dan Spiegle, distributed by Gold Key Comics.

See also 
 Trog, a 1970 film about the discovery of a caveman in England
 Iceman, a 1984 film about an unfrozen caveman
 Unfrozen Caveman Lawyer, recurring character on Saturday Night Live from 1991 through 1996
 Encino Man, a 1992 film about an unfrozen caveman
 Cavemen, a 2007 sitcom that aired on ABC

References

External links

 
It's About Time Opening on YouTube

1966 American television series debuts
1967 American television series endings
1960s American comic science fiction television series
1960s American sitcoms
American fantasy television series
American time travel television series
CBS original programming
English-language television shows
Prehistoric people in popular culture
Television shows adapted into comics
Television series by United Artists Television
Television series created by Sherwood Schwartz
Television shows set in Los Angeles
1960s American time travel television series
Science fantasy television series
Television series set in prehistory
Television series set in the 1960s
Television series about astronauts
Television series about cavemen